The 2015–16 Nemzeti Bajnokság I/B is the 64th season of the Nemzeti Bajnokság I/B, Hungary's premier Handball league. Since 2016 the official name of the championship is K&H Férfi Kézilabda Liga due to sponsorship reasons.

Team information

Western Group (Nyugat)
The following 14 clubs compete in the NB I/B (Western) during the 2015–16 season:

Eastern Group (Kelet)
The following 14 clubs compete in the NB I/B (Eastern) during the 2015–16 season:

See also
 2015–16 Nemzeti Bajnokság I

References

External links 

Handball leagues in Hungary
2015 in Hungarian sport
2016 in Hungarian sport